The National Security Council Act 2016 is "to provide for the establishment of the National Security Council, the declaration of security areas, the special powers of the Security Forces in the security areas and other related matters". This Act is intended to strengthen the government's ability to address increasing threats to the nation's security, including threats of violent extremism. The Bill was introduced into parliament by Shahidan Kassim on 1 December 2015. It passed the Dewan Rakyat (House of Representatives) on 3 December 2015, and the Dewan Negara (Senate) on 22 December 2015 without amendment. The Act received Royal Assent on 18 February 2016 in pursuant to Clause 4A of Article 66 of the Federal Constitution.

The Bill has faced considerable consideration from human rights groups and other organisations both within Malaysia and internationally. Before the bill passed the Senate, the European Parliament passed a resolution calling for the Bill's withdrawal.

Structure
The National Security Council Act 2016, in its current form (7 June 2016), consists of 7 Parts containing 44 sections and no schedule (including no amendment).
Part I: Preliminary
Part II: National Security Council
Part III: Duties of the Director General of National Security and Government Entities
Part IV: Declaration of Security Area
Part V: Special Powers of the Director of Operations and Security Forces Deployed to the Security Area
Part VI: General
Part VII: Savings

References

External links
National Security Council Act 2016 
Text of the National Security Council Bill 2015

Malaysian federal legislation
2016 in Malaysian law